Preston Davie (January 31, 1881 – May 21, 1967) was an American lawyer and colonel during World War I. Davie received a Distinguished Service Medal for his efforts.

Early life
Davie was born in Louisville, Kentucky on January 31, 1881, a son of George M. Davie.  He was a grandson of Maj. Gen. William Preston of the Confederate Army who was a member of Congress and U.S. Minister to Spain, and a descendant of William Richardson Davie, the 10th Governor of North Carolina and U.S. Minister to France who was a General in the Continental Army during the American Revolutionary War.

Upon completing military service, he graduated from Harvard College and Harvard Law School.

Career
He amassed a large collection of historical documents over the course of his life, pertaining to the early settling of the United States. These include The Preston Davie Collection of Early Americana housed at University of North Carolina.

Career
From his first marriage to Emily H. Bedford, which ended in divorce, he was the father of a son and daughter, E. T. Bedford Davie and Mrs. Emily Davie Kornfeld.

In 1930, he married his second wife Eugenie Mary "May" Ladenburg (1895–1975), who was a prominent activist in the Republican Party. She assisted in the donation of many of his collections following his death.

Davie died at his home, 71 East 71st Street, in Manhattan, on May 21, 1967.

References

External links
Preston Davie Papers via University of North Carolina at Chapel Hill
Preston Davie Papers, 1750–1967. 633 items. Mss1D2856d. Microfilm reel C15. via Virginia Historical Society
Mausoleum of William Richardson Davie

1881 births
1967 deaths
Harvard Law School alumni
Recipients of the Distinguished Service Medal (US Army)